Laura (also known as Laura en América, Laura sin censura, Laura de todos, Laura en acción, Que Pase Laura) is a Peruvian tabloid talk show, hosted by lawyer Laura Bozzo.

The show originated as Laura en América ("Laura in the Americas") and first aired on America TV in February 1998. Bozzo had previously done a similar program called Intimidades ("Intimacies") in 1997. Laura is known for displaying various social problems such as domestic violence, adultery, alcoholism and drug addiction.

Laura en América was the most-watched program in Peru in the late 1990s and one of the most tuned-in talk show in several Latin American countries. The talk show stopped broadcasting in 2001, after the Alberto Fujimori controversy, which involved Bozzo. In the following years, Bozzo continued to record different programs with the same format, but were only transmitted abroad for the Telemundo International chain or cable television. Bozzo had planned to return to Peruvian television through Panamericana Television in 2007, but the project was canceled due to differences between her and her producers. She then returned for a short time at the Peruvian channel ATV, with a program of the same format called Laura en acción ("Laura in action"), which was cancelled due to several complaints.

History
Laura en América aired in February 1998 on America TV in Peru. On June 26, 1998, while taping the 100th anniversary show, a stampede of people rushed into the Dibos Coliseum in Lima. More than 63 were injured and one elderly woman was trampled. Laura en América began being broadcast to Bolivia, Paraguay, Colombia, Chile and Ecuador in 1999.

In January 2000, Laura en América began being broadcast by Telemundo, which gained the show immense ratings and popularity. Laura en América became the top-rated show among adults in its slot in key United States markets in February 2001.

In 2009, Mexican company TV Azteca hosted Bozzo's program Laura de todos ("Laura of all"), but a year later Bozzo changed to the company Televisa, where the program was retitled as simply Laura.

References

Telemundo original programming
1998 Peruvian television series debuts
1990s Peruvian television series
2000s Peruvian television series
2010s Peruvian television series
América Televisión original programming